Raquel Eliana Argandoña de la Fuente (December 5, 1957 in Santiago de Chile) is a Chilean former beauty pageant contestant, TV presenter, actress mayor of Pelarco. She is best known for her role as the La Quintrala in the 1986 TV mini-series of the same name. Raquel Argandoña was also the 1975 Miss Universo Chile. Raquel is the mother of the actress-singer Raquel Calderón.

Electoral Resume

Municipal Elections 1996 
Pelarco's mayoralty

Municipal Elections 2000 

Pelarco's mayoralty

Municipal Elections 2004 

San Joaquín's mayoralty

Parliamentary Elections 2005 

 Deputy for the Distrito 25 (La Granja, Macul and  San Joaquín), Región Metropolitana

References

External links
Official website

Especial de Raquel Argandoña on EMOL.

1957 births
20th-century Chilean women politicians
20th-century Chilean politicians
21st-century Chilean women politicians
21st-century Chilean politicians
Chilean people of Basque descent
Chilean television actresses
Chilean television personalities
Chilean television presenters
Living people
Miss Universe 1975 contestants
Miss Universo Chile winners
National Renewal (Chile) politicians
People from Santiago
Women mayors of places in Chile
OTI Festival presenters
Chilean women television presenters
Beauty queen-politicians